Manasterzec  (Manastyrets’) is a village in the administrative district of Gmina Lesko, within Lesko County, Subcarpathian Voivodeship, in south-eastern Poland.

The village has a population of 450.

References

Manasterzec